Claes Emil Tholin (22 October 1860 in Södra Säm, Älvsborgs län – 27 June 1927 in Stockholm) was the first leader of the Swedish Social Democratic Party 1896–1907, after collective leadership had been applied in 1889–1896. He was a tailor by occupation. In the years 1880–1890 he worked in Copenhagen and became a member of the tailor's union board there. After returning to Sweden he continued his work as a tailor while becoming a leading force in the Swedish social democratic movement.

References 

1860 births
1927 deaths
Leaders of the Swedish Social Democratic Party